Badri Lal Yadav was an Indian politician from Madhya Pradesh, India. He was elected from Biaora constituency in 1993 and 2003 as a member of Bharatiya Janata Party.

Political life
Yadav served as a minister of state in Gaur ministry under Babulal Gaur government.

References

Bharatiya Janata Party politicians from Madhya Pradesh
Madhya Pradesh MLAs 1993–1998
Madhya Pradesh MLAs 2003–2008
People from Rajgarh district